The 2021 Healthy Ageing Tour was a women's cycle stage race that was held in the Netherlands from 10 to 12 March 2021. The 2021 edition of the race was the tenth running of the Healthy Ageing Tour, being held with a UCI rating of 2.1.

Teams 
Six UCI Women's WorldTeams, eight UCI Women's Continental Teams, and two UCI Women's National Teams made up the seventeen teams that participated in the race. Only the German national team and  did not enter the maximum of six riders, as they each entered five. 94 riders started the race, of which 34 finished.

UCI Women's WorldTeams

 
 
 
 
 
 

UCI Women's Continental Teams

 
 
 
 
 
 
 
 

UCI Women's National Teams

 Germany
 Netherlands

Route

Stages

Stage 1 
10 March 2021 — TT Circuit Assen to TT Circuit Assen,

Stage 2 
11 March 2021 — Lauwersoog to Lauwersoog,  (ITT)

Stage 3 
12 March 2021 — Wijster to Wijster,

Classification leadership table

Final classification standings

General classification

Points classification

Mountains classification

Sprints classification

Young rider classification

Combined classification

Team classification

See also 
 2021 in women's road cycling

References 

2021
Healthy Ageing Tour
Healthy Ageing Tour
Healthy Ageing Tour